Cor Van den Heuvel (born March 6, 1931) is an American haiku poet, editor and archivist.

Biography
Van den Heuvel was born in Biddeford, Maine, and grew up in Maine and New Hampshire. He lives on Long Island near his niece and still spends time writing and exploring nature.

He first discovered haiku in 1958 in San Francisco where he heard Gary Snyder mention it at a poetry reading. He returned to the East Coast the following year and continued composing haiku. He became the house poet of a Boston coffee house, reading haiku and other poetry to jazz musical accompaniment. In 1971 he joined the Haiku Society of America and became its president in 1978.

Work
Van den Heuvel has published several books of his own haiku, including one on baseball. He is the editor of the three editions of The Haiku Anthology; the original Haiku Anthology published in 1974 by Doubleday, the second edition published in 1986 by Simon & Schuster, and the third edition published in 1999 by Norton.

Honors
The Haiku Society of America has given Van den Heuvel three Merit Book Awards for his haiku. He was the honorary curator of the American Haiku Archives at the California State Library at Sacramento for 1999-2000. He worked at Newsweek magazine in the layout department until he retired in 1988. He was the United States representative to the 1990 International Haiku Symposium in Matsuyama. At the World Haiku Festival held in London and Oxford in 2000, he received a World Haiku Achievement Award. In 2002, he was awarded The Masaoka Shiki International Haiku Awards in Matsuyama, for his writing and editing of haiku books.

He has been described in The Alsop Review as "an intelligent and unflagging spokesperson for haiku".

Bibliography
The Haiku Anthology (editor), 1st edition, Anchor Books, 1974, 
The Haiku Anthology (editor), 2nd edition, Simon and Schuster, 1986, 
The Haiku Anthology (editor), 3rd edition, Norton, 1999, 
Past Time: Baseball Haiku (editor, with Jim Kacian), Red Moon Press, 1999, 
Play Ball : Baseball Haiku (author), Red Moon Press, 1999, 
Baseball Haiku (editor, with Nanae Tamura), Norton, 2007, 
A Boy's Seasons: Haibun Memoirs (author), Single Island Press, 2010,

See also
 Jim Kacian

References

Haiku International Association page on Cor van den Heuvel
Millikin University Haiku Writer Profile: Cor Van den Heuval

American male poets
English-language haiku poets
Living people
1931 births
People from Biddeford, Maine
Poets from Maine